Patricia Salas O'Brien (also known as, Patricia Salas; Arequipa, December 6, 1958) is a Peruvian sociologist with expertise in education and social development. She served as Minister of Education of Peru from July 28, 2011, to October 31, 2013.

Biography
Emma Patricia Salas O'Brien holds a degree in sociology from the National University of Saint Augustine (UNSA), with a master's degree in Development Strategies and Social Policies from the same university. She also completed a Ph.D. in Social Sciences at the Catholic University of Santa María (UCSM) in Arequipa.

She has been a senior lecturer at the Faculty of Social History and Sociology at UCSM (1989-2010), as well as a senior lecturer and researcher at the Institute for Educational Research and Policy at the Antonio Ruiz de Montoya University (UARM) (2010-2011).

On July 28, 2011, she was sworn in as Minister of Education, as a member of President Ollanta Humala's first cabinet. The ceremony was held in the Golden Hall of the Government Palace.

References

1958 births
Living people
People from Arequipa
Peruvian Ministers of Education
Peruvian sociologists
Peruvian women sociologists
National University of Saint Augustine alumni
Catholic University of Santa María alumni